Salvador Flores (born 1906, date of death unknown) was a Paraguayan football defender who played for Paraguay in the 1930 FIFA World Cup. He also played for Cerro Porteño.

References

External links
FIFA profile

1906 births
Paraguayan footballers
Paraguay international footballers
Association football defenders
Cerro Porteño players
1930 FIFA World Cup players
Year of death missing